Gui Youguang (1507–1571) was a Chinese writer of Ming Dynasty. His courtesy name was Xifu and his art name was Zhenchuan, and he was also known as Xiangji Sheng (literally Scholar of Xiangji).

His prose writings were highly praised. People of his time regarded him as a modern-day Ouyang Xiu, an important writer of the earlier Song Dynasty, and later generations praised his works as "the best prose of the Ming Dynasty". He was one of the early masters of the xiaopin.

Names and titles

Youguang 
When Gui's mother conceived him, it was said that there was a rainbow glowed in the yard, while its light reached the sky, which was deemed lucky. Accordingly, he was gave the name "Youguang", literally "There was a light" in Chinese.

Zhenchuan 
Gui detested art names when he was young. Once he was notice as an exception without one at a party, thus the others began to call him "Zhenchuan". It is a compound of two geographical nouns: "zhen" refers to "Zhenze", the ancient name of Lake Tai which adjoins his hometown, while "chuan" is a synonym for river in Chinese, refers to the Yangtze River sometimes. However, Gui still rejected that until he met He Qitu, an erudite scholar from Henan who happened to share the same art name with him. Gui took "Zhenchuan" out of admiration for He, he also made an analogy between them and Sima Xiangru together with Lin Xiangru.

Xiangji Sheng 
Gui's ancestors once lived along a river call Xiangjijing in Taicang during Yuan dynasty, later he designate his sanctum as Xiangjixuan to commemorate them probably. Hence, Gui called himself Xiangji Sheng. While "Xiangji" is supposed to be the abbreviation of "Xiangjixuan".

Biography 
Gui Youguang was born in Kunshan, Suzhou Prefecture, a satellite city in south-east Jiangsu Province nowadays. His family had been a large, important family in the past, but by Gui Youguang's time, their influence were starting to decline. When he was only seven years old, his mother died, leaving her husband to support their three sons and two daughters. After that, his family lived a much harder life; Gui learned about suffering and sorrow at a very early age. Because of his cleverness and hard work, Gui was able to write relatively good articles when he was only nine years old. At the age of ten, he wrote an article of several thousand words, called Qi xi [On Begging Vinegar]. At the age of 14, Gui was qualified to take prefecture examination, and took the exam when he was 20 years old.

Gui finally passed the provincial examinations, and became a Juren ranked second at age 35, in 1540. In the meantime, his first wife, who came from Wei clan, died. Then he married a woman who came from Wang clan of Anting, which had once been prosperous. Since the clan was on the decline, a younger descendant sold the local mansion treasured by the other members as heritage to pay taxes. On that account, his new wife begged him to get a loan and redeem the mansion. In about 1541, he paid off all the debts eventually and moved to Anting, Jiading.

Gui spent most of his time at Anting on reading. Moreover, he tutored up to hundreds students who worshipped him. During those intervening triennial springs, he went to Nanjing eight times to take the higher examinations but failed. In 1565, Gui finally got a Jinshi in his ninth examination. Gui became a Zhixian in Changxing at the age of sixty. When Gui was judging, he allowed local people to utter Wu Chinese instead of Mandarin so that they could state clearly. Besides, he seldom imprisoned the defendant if the case could be conciliated. Three years later, Gui was transferred to be a Tongpan (an official position) in Shunde, he was in charge of local horse administration. In 1570, Gui went to Beijing to celebrate Longqing Emperor's birthday. Admired by Gao Gong and Zhao Zhenji, he was promoted to be the Sicheng (an official position) of Nanjing Taipusi. But he was still kept in Beijing by Li Chunfang to compile Shizong Shilu for Jiajing Emperor. In the next year, Gui died of illness in Beijing at the age of 64. He was buried at Kunshan in 1575.

Family 
Gui's father was Zheng, while his mother was Zhou Gui. He had two younger brothers: Youshang and Yougong; An elder sister Shujing and a younger sister Shushun.

Gui had three wives and a concubine.

His first wife's surname was Wei. They married in about 1529, five year later she died. She bore him a daughter and a son. In about 1536, he married Wang. Wang died in about 1552, one year later, Gui married to his third wife Fei.

Hanhua initially was a handmaiden accompanying Wei; when Wei married, she was only nine years old. After Wei's death, she became Gui's concubine, before she died at the age of 18.

Sons: Zixiao or Zengsun as birth name (1533–1548?), Zihu, Zining, Longsun, Zijun, Zimu, Zixiao

Daughters: Rulan (1534–1535), Erer (1538–1539) and other three.

Writings 
Gui was one of mid-Ming notable writers of the xiaopin.

Books:
Sanwu shuili lu
Mazheng zhi
Taipu zhi

Travel notes:
Jiwei fushi zaji
Renxu jixing

Prose (including lesser works, or xiaopin):
Xiangjixuan zhi
Xianbi shilue
Siziting ji
Nü Erer kuangzhi 
Baojieshan juji
Juchuang ji

Influence 
Gui professed a distaste for the Revivalist School. He criticized the later Revivalists such as Wang Shizhen, a contemporary bureaucrat and scholar. Wang Shenzhong, Mao Kun, Tang Shunzhi and Gui etc. were bracketed together as Tang Song pai (a school advocating Tang and Song dynasties' classic works of literature) afterwards, while Gui was regarded as the head of them. These writers of the mid-Ming created the canon of the eight great Tang and Songwriters which impact hitherto.

Despite Wang Shizhen and Gui being horrid to each other, Wang expressed great esteem towards him and compared his works to those of Han Yu and Ouyang Xiu, after Gui's death.

Qian Qianyi praised his works as "the best prose of the Ming Dynasty".

In 1828, Tao Zhu, the Jiangsu Xunfu of that time, got permission from the emperor to memorialize Gui by establishing the Zhenchuan Academy, which was completed after three years’construction. It was closed in 1903. One year later, An Yuan and some other people founded the Zhenchuan Primary School at the former campus of Zhenchuan Academy. After several years, Zhenchuan junior high school was added to Zhenchuan Primary School.
Now the school is called Anting Junior High School which is located in Anting Town, Jiading District, Shanghai.

References

Cited works 

 
 
 
 Mair, Victor H. (ed.) (2001). The Columbia History of Chinese Literature. New York: Columbia University Press. . (Amazon Kindle edition.)
 
 

1506 births
1571 deaths
Ming dynasty essayists
Writers from Suzhou
People from Kunshan